Sylvan Beach is a village in Oneida County, New York, United States; in the southeastern end of the Town of Vienna. It is twenty-two miles west of Rome. At the 2010 census, the population of Sylvan Beach was  897.

History 
Before European exploration began, the area was used by Native Americans, mostly for its supply of fish. Many of the areas surrounding Oneida Lake have actually been bearers of artifacts that have helped us learn more about Native Americans. The Oneidas and the Onondagas, of the Iroquois Confederacy chose to settle in the Oneida Lake region.

The community was founded around 1840. Public transportation, in the form of railroads and ferries, made the village a desirable resort community since the 19th century. The Village of Sylvan Beach was incorporated in 1971.

The Sylvan Beach Union Chapel was listed on the National Register of Historic Places in 2009.

Geography
Sylvan Beach is located at  (43.204358, -75.726428).

Sylvan Beach is on the eastern shore of Oneida Lake and is adjacent to the Erie Canal, which made the village a convenient shipping port for all of the lake in the 1820s.

Demographics

As of the census of 2000, there were 1,071 people, 472 households, and 279 families residing in the village. The population density was 1,458.4 people per square mile (566.5/km2). There were 847 housing units at an average density of 1,153.4 per square mile (448.0/km2). The racial makeup of the village was 97.76% White, 0.75% African American, 0.19% Native American, 0.28% Asian, 0.37% from other races, and 0.65% from two or more races. Hispanic or Latino of any race were 0.65% of the population.

There were 472 households, out of which 24.6% had children under the age of 18 living with them, 44.3% were married couples living together, 9.7% had a female householder with no husband present, and 40.7% were non-families. 30.3% of all households were made up of individuals, and 12.1% had someone living alone who was 65 years of age or older. The average household size was 2.27 and the average family size was 2.83.

In the village, the population was spread out, with 21.5% under the age of 18, 6.9% from 18 to 24, 27.3% from 25 to 44, 30.1% from 45 to 64, and 14.3% who were 65 years of age or older. The median age was 41 years. For every 100 females, there were 105.6 males. For every 100 females age 18 and over, there were 103.1 males. In the city's population, 49.5% are males and 50.5% are females.

The median income for a household in the village was $30,978, and the median income for a family was $35,250. Males had a median income of $30,250 versus $18,625 for females. The per capita income for the village was $15,876. About 13.2% of families and 17.0% of the population were below the poverty line, including 25.1% of those under age 18 and 13.5% of those age 65 or over.

The total amount of housing is 946. Of those, 34.4% of those homes are used for recreational, seasonal, or occasional use (which is 325 homes). 46.6% of houses in the beach are vacant, which adds up to 441 homes. 2.7% of homes are for rent and 2.0% are for sale totaling 45 homes.

Recreation 

The village is home to a beach, an amusement park, camping facilities, marinas, and a wide variety of restaurants and shops. Situated on the eastern shore of Oneida Lake, the village attracts many boaters and fishing enthusiasts. The summer is best time for visitors with many different events going on and many places to eat. In the summer, every Tuesday at 5 p.m., the "Bikes at the Beach" event occurs, where motorcycles flood the street.

References

External links

 Past history of Sylvan Beach
 Sylvan Beach Website
 Sylvan Beach Mile

Villages in New York (state)
Utica–Rome metropolitan area
Villages in Oneida County, New York
Tourist attractions in Oneida County, New York